District 11 of the Texas Senate is a senatorial district that currently serves portions of Brazoria, Galveston and Harris counties in the U.S. state of Texas.

The current Senator from District 11 is Larry Taylor.

Top 5 biggest cities in district
District 11 has a population of 791,770 with 582,677 that is at voting age from the 2010 census.

District officeholders

Election history
Election history of District 11 from 1992.

2020

2016

2012

2008

2004

2002

1998

1994

1992

Notes

References

11
Brazoria County, Texas
Galveston County, Texas
Harris County, Texas